Tecotosh is an outdoor 2005–2006 stainless steel and glass sculpture by Ed Carpenter, installed at the Portland State University campus in Portland, Oregon, United States.

Description
Tecotosh, designed by Ed Carpenter, is located outside the Maseeh College of Engineering and Computer Science at the intersection of Southwest 4th and College on the Portland State University campus. The abstract sculpture is made of a stainless steel truss, cables, hardware, laminated dichroic glass, and lights. The Smithsonian Institution lists the Northwest Center for Engineering, Science and Technology as the work's owner.

See also
 2006 in art

References

External links
 State funds PSU engineering school sculpture (February 20, 2003), Portland Business Journal
 Oregon's Percent for Art Program: A Public Legacy

2006 establishments in Oregon
2006 sculptures
Abstract sculptures in Oregon
Outdoor sculptures in Portland, Oregon
Portland State University campus
Stainless steel sculptures in Oregon